Ching Maou Wei (born 14 November 1985) is an American Samoan professional swimmer. He qualified for the 2012 Summer Olympics in London, despite the absence of a professional swimming pool in American Samoa. Radio Australia called Maou Wei's qualification as one of the "most unlikely of success stories" of the 2012 Summer Olympics.

Maou Wei was chosen as American Samoa's flag bearer during the 2012 Summer Olympics Parade of Nations at the Opening Ceremony. He hails from the village of Faga'alu.

References

External links
 

1985 births
Living people
American people of Samoan descent
Olympic swimmers of American Samoa
American Samoan male swimmers
American Samoan people of Chinese descent
Swimmers at the 2012 Summer Olympics
Sportspeople of Chinese descent
People from Faga'alu